Stable Isotope Labeling by/with Amino acids in Cell culture (SILAC) is a technique based on mass spectrometry that detects differences in protein abundance among samples using non-radioactive isotopic labeling. It is a popular method for quantitative proteomics.

Procedure
Two populations of cells are cultivated in cell culture. One of the cell populations is fed with growth medium containing normal amino acids. In contrast, the second population is fed with growth medium containing amino acids labeled with stable (non-radioactive) heavy isotopes. For example, the medium can contain arginine labeled with six carbon-13 atoms (13C) instead of the normal carbon-12 (12C).   When the cells are growing in this medium, they incorporate the heavy arginine into all of their proteins. Thereafter, all peptides containing a single arginine are 6 Da heavier than their normal counterparts. Alternatively, uniform labeling with 13C or 15N can be used. Proteins from both cell populations are combined and analyzed together by mass spectrometry as pairs of chemically identical peptides of different stable-isotope composition can be differentiated in a mass spectrometer owing to their mass difference. The ratio of peak intensities in the mass spectrum for such peptide pairs reflects the abundance ratio for the two proteins.

Applications
A SILAC approach involving incorporation of tyrosine labeled with nine carbon-13 atoms (13C) instead of the normal carbon-12 (12C) has been utilized to study tyrosine kinase substrates in signaling pathways. SILAC has emerged as a very powerful method to study cell signaling, post translation modifications such as phosphorylation, protein–protein interaction and regulation of gene expression. In addition, SILAC has become an important method in secretomics, the global study of secreted proteins and secretory pathways. It can be used to distinguish between proteins secreted by cells in culture and serum contaminants. Standardized protocols of SILAC for various applications have also been published.

While SILAC had been mostly used in studying eukaryotic cells and cell cultures, it had been recently employed in bacteria and its multicellular biofilm in antibiotic tolerance, to differentiate tolerance and sensitive subpopulations.

Pulsed SILAC 
Pulsed SILAC (pSILAC) is a variation of the SILAC method where the labelled amino acids are added to the growth medium for only a short period of time. This allows monitoring differences in de novo protein production rather than raw concentration.

It had also been used to study biofilm tolerance to antibiotics to differentiate tolerant and sensitive subpopulations

NeuCode SILAC 
Traditionally the level of multiplexing in SILAC was limited due to the number of SILAC isotopes available. Recently, a new technique called NeuCode (neutron encoding) SILAC, has augmented the level of multiplexing achievable with metabolic labeling (up to 4). The NeuCode amino acid method is similar to SILAC but differs in that the labeling only utilizes heavy amino acids. The use of only heavy amino acids eliminates the need for 100% incorporation of amino acids needed for SILAC. The increased multiplexing capability of NeuCode amino acids is from the use of mass defects from extra neutrons in the stable isotopes. These small mass differences however need to be resolved on high resolution mass spectrometers.

References

Further reading

External links 
SILAC resource Mann Lab
SILAC resource Pandey Lab
SILAC resource Center for Experimental Bioinformatics (CEBI)

Biochemistry methods
Biotechnology
Mass spectrometry
Proteomics
Protein–protein interaction assays